Kotpad (Sl. No.: 142) is a Vidhan Sabha constituency of Koraput district, Odisha.

This constituency includes Kotpad, Kotpad block, Kundra block, 11 Gram panchayats (Dengapadar, Aunli, Malda, Sanparia, Jujhari, Kamara, Pondasguda, Sosahandi, Kanagam, Anchala and Bijapur) of Borigumma block and 7 Gram panchayats (Gupteswar, Ramagiri, Dandabadi, Baligam, Kathapada, Majhiguda and Tentuliguma) of Boipariguda block.

In 2014 election, Indian National Congress candidate Chandra Sekhar Majhi won from this constituency.

In 2019 election, BJD candidate Padmini Dian won from this constituency.

Elected Members

Thirteen elections were held between 1961 and 2014.
Elected members from the Kotpad constituency are:
2019: (142):  Padmini Dian (BJD)
2014: (142): Chandra Sekhar Majhi, (Congress)
2009: (142): Basudev Majhi (Congress)
2004: (88): Basudev Majhi (Congress)
2000: (88): Basudev Majhi (Congress)
1995: (88): Basudev Majhi (Congress)
1990: (88): Sadan Naik (Janata Dal
1985: (88): Basudev Majhi (Congress)
1980: (88): Basudev Majhi (Congress-I)
1977: (88): Basudev Majhi (Congress)
1974: (88): Basudev Majhi (Congress)
1971: (83): Dhansayi Rondhari (Swatantra Party)
1967: (83): Surya Narayan Majhi (Congress)
1961: (5): Mahadev Bakria (Congress)

2019 Election Result

2014 Election

Summary of results of the 2009 Election

Notes

References

Assembly constituencies of Odisha
Koraput district